Tuglie is a town and comune in the Italian province of Lecce in the Apulia region of south-east Italy.

People 
Giuseppe Miggiano, Belgian artist, was born here

Twin towns
Tuglie is twinned with:

  Villaverla, Italy, since 2006

References

Cities and towns in Apulia
Localities of Salento